The following is a list of Malayalam films released in the year 1997.

Dubbed films

References 

 1997
1997
Malayalam
 Mal
1997 in Indian cinema